Dublin Township may refer to several places in the United States:

 Dublin Township, Swift County, Minnesota
 Dublin Township, Mercer County, Ohio
 Dublin Township, Fulton County, Pennsylvania
 Dublin Township, Huntingdon County, Pennsylvania

See also 
 Lower Dublin Township, Pennsylvania, defunct, part of the defunct Dublin Township in Philadelphia County
 Upper Dublin Township, Montgomery County, Pennsylvania 

Township name disambiguation pages